Uijeongbu KB Insurance Stars is a South Korean professional volleyball team. The team was founded in 1976 and became fully professional in 2005. They are based in Uijeongbu and are members of the Korea Volleyball Federation (KOVO). Their home arena is Uijeongbu Gymnasium.

Honours
 Korea Volleyball Super League
Runners-up (5): 1985, 1987, 1991, 1995, 2002 

V-League
Runners-up: 2021–22

 KOVO Cup
Winners: 2012
Runners-up (3): 2007, 2016, 2018

Season-by-season records

Players

2022−23 team

See also
Cheongju KB Stars

External links
Official website 

Volleyball clubs established in 1976
Sport in Gyeonggi Province
South Korean volleyball clubs
 
Uijeongbu
1976 establishments in South Korea